Leonid Kharitonov may refer to:

 Leonid Kharitonov (actor) (1930–1987), Soviet actor
 Leonid Kharitonov (singer) (1933–2017), Russian singer